Richard Levinson and William Link were American television producers and writers who collaborated for 43 years, until Levinson's death. They wrote for the CBS anthology drama The DuPont Show with June Allyson, and they created classic television detective series such as Columbo; Mannix; Ellery Queen; Murder, She Wrote and Scene of the Crime; and made-for-TV movies including The Gun, My Sweet Charlie, That Certain Summer, The Judge and Jake Wyler, The Execution of Private Slovik, Charlie Cobb: A Nice Night for a Hanging, Rehearsal for Murder, "Guilty Conscience", and Blacke's Magic. They also collaborated on two feature films: The Hindenburg (1975) and Rollercoaster (1977).

Levinson and Link occasionally used the pseudonym "Ted Leighton", most notably on the telefilm Ellery Queen: Don't Look Behind You, where their work was substantially re-written by other hands, and Columbo when they came up with stories to be scripted by their collaborators.

In 1979, Levinson and Link received a Special Edgar Award from the Mystery Writers of America for their work on Ellery Queen and Columbo. During the 1980s, they were three-time winners of the Edgar for Best TV Feature or MiniSeries Teleplay, and in 1989 they were given the Mystery Writers of America's Ellery Queen Award, which honors outstanding mystery writing teams. In November 1995, they were jointly elected to the Television Academy Hall of Fame.

See also
Richard Levinson
William Link

References

External links

American crime fiction writers
American television writers
American male screenwriters
American television producers
American film producers
American male television writers
American male novelists